The Icelandic Centre for Research (RANNÍS; Icelandic: Rannsóknamiðstöð Íslands) funds and promotes scientific research in Iceland. It formed in 2003 through an act of legislation. As of 2007, the Ministry of Education, Science and Culture oversees its activities. It operates from headquarters on Borgartún in Reykjavík.

RANNÍS cooperates closely with the Icelandic Science and Technology Policy Council and provides professional assistance in the preparation and implementation of the national science and technology policy. RANNÍS administers competitive funds in the fields of research, innovation, education and culture, as well as strategic research programmes. RANNÍS coordinates and promotes Icelandic participation in European programmes such, as Horizon 2020 in the fields of research and innovation, Erasmus+ in the fields of education, training, youth and sport, and Creative Europe in the fields of culture and audiovisual media. In addition, RANNÍS monitors resources and performance in R&D and promotes public awareness of research and innovation, education and culture in Iceland.

History 
From 1994 to 2003, RANNÍS operated as the Icelandic Research Council. "As of 2013 scientific publications based on projects, funded entirely or partially by the Icelandic Centre for Research, Rannís, must be published in open access."

Funds 
Through the research fund Rannis provides funding for domestic projects, and salaries for doctoral students.

References

Further reading

External links 
 
 VIAF. Rannsóknamiðstöð Íslands

Government agencies of Iceland
Organizations based in Reykjavík
Organizations established in 2003
Science and technology in Iceland
2003 establishments in Iceland
Research funding agencies